The Huallaga tanager (Ramphocelus melanogaster) or black-bellied tanager, is a species of bird in the family Thraupidae.
It is endemic to Peru.

Its natural habitats are subtropical or tropical moist lowland forests and heavily degraded former forest.

References

Huallaga tanager
Birds of the Peruvian Amazon
Endemic birds of Peru
Huallaga tanager
Taxonomy articles created by Polbot